Csonogor Vargha (born 13 February 1946) is a Hungarian sprint canoer who competed in the early to mid-1970s. He won five medals at the ICF Canoe Sprint World Championships with two golds (K-4 1000 m: 1973, K-4 10000 m: 1973), two silvers (K-4 10000 m: 1971, 1974), and a bronze (K-4 1000 m: 1974).

Vargha also finished sixth in the K-4 1000 m event at the 1972 Summer Olympics in Munich.

References

External links
 
 

1946 births
Living people
Hungarian male canoeists
ICF Canoe Sprint World Championships medalists in kayak
Olympic canoeists of Hungary
Canoeists at the 1972 Summer Olympics
20th-century Hungarian people